Shore Fire Media is a public relations firm based in Brooklyn, New York that specializes in entertainment and popular culture. According to Variety, at 21 nominations, Shore Fire Media had the largest number of Grammy Award nods of any public relations firm for the 60th Annual Grammy Awards in 2018. In 2023, Shore Fire's clients had 43 Grammy nominations.

History 
Shore Fire Media was founded in 1990 by Marilyn Laverty in a small office in Brooklyn, New York with one employee and two desks, and future company senior VP Mark Satlof as a consultant.

Laverty previously had worked for 13 years at Columbia Records, rising to become VP of publicity. In 2016, Billboard named Laverty one of the music industry's most powerful female executives in its annual "Women in Music" issue. She has had a long-standing relationship with musician Bruce Springsteen as his publicist.

While the company originally focused on the music industry, it later branched into a wider client base including venues, businesses, websites, books, and non-music events. 

In 2013, 2014, 2015, 2018, and 2019, The New York Observer named Shore Fire to its annual PR Power 50 List of the most powerful entertainment and media PR firms. In 2016, The Observer listed Shore Fire as New York City's top arts/culture/media firm, and was recognized again in 2023 for music and entertainment.

In 2013, Shore Fire opened an office in Nashville, Tennessee.
In January 2018, Shore Fire opened an office in Los Angeles, California.

In December 2019, the entertainment marketing and content development company Dolphin Entertainment acquired Shore Fire.

References

External links

 
 
 Shore Fire Blog

Companies based in New York City
Public relations companies of the United States
Mass media companies established in 1990
American companies established in 1990
1990 establishments in New York City